Zeng Shaoshan (December 1914 – January 26, 1995) was a People's Liberation Army lieutenant general. He was born in Jinzhai County, Anhui Province. He joined the Chinese Communist Party in 1933 and was a member of the Chinese Workers' and Peasants' Red Army. He later joined the Eighth Route Army during the Second Sino-Japanese War. He was the Chinese Communist Party Committee Secretary and Governor of Liaoning Province.

References

1914 births
1995 deaths
People's Republic of China politicians from Anhui
Chinese Communist Party politicians from Anhui
People's Liberation Army generals from Anhui
Governors of Liaoning
Political office-holders in Liaoning
People from Jinzhai County
Politicians from Lu'an